Maria Amalia "Melina" Mercouri (18 October 1920 – 6 March 1994) was a Greek actress, singer, activist, and politician. She came from a political family that was prominent over multiple generations. She received an Academy Award nomination and won a Cannes Film Festival Best Actress Award for her performance in the film Never on Sunday (1960). Mercouri was also nominated for one Tony Award, three Golden Globes and two BAFTA Awards in her acting career. In 1987 she was awarded a special prize in the first edition of the Europe Theatre Prize.

As a politician, she was a member of the PASOK and the Hellenic Parliament. In October 1981, Mercouri became the first female Minister of Culture and Sports. She was the longest-lived Minister of Culture in Greece - serving during the years 1981-89 and 1993 till her death in 1994, in all PASOK governments.

Biography

Family 
The Mercouri's were a prominent Greek family from Argolida. Its members had fought in the revolution of 1821. Melina's grandfather, Spyridon Mercouris, had served for many years as mayor of Athens. Her father, Stamatis Mercouris, was an officer of the cavalry and served as a member of parliament and minister (People's Party, National Radical Party), and for many years he participated in the administration of the Panathinaikos team. During the Axis occupation of Greece, Stamatis Mercouris founded the resistance organisation called 'Radical Organisation' in January 1942. 

Her mother, Irene Lappa, was the sister of Admiral Pyrros Lappa, who served as Chief of the Naval Staff, Secretary General of the Olympic Games Committee and Chief of the Military House of King Paul.

Her uncle, George S. Mercouris, held extreme right-wing political views. He was a founder of the Greek National Socialist Party and a governor of the National Bank during the occupation. This so angered the Mercouri family that they refused to attend his funeral in 1943.

Education 
In September 1938, she was accepted at the Drama School of the National Theatre with fellow students including Despo Diamantidou and Alexis Damianos.

Marriage 
In the winter of 1939 she married the much older wealthy landowner Panagis Harokopos. She travelled as Melina Harokopou or Melina Charocopou.

During the occupation 
During the occupation, Melina became romantically involved with businessman Phidias Yadikiaroglou while still married to Harokopos although their marital relationship had effectively ended. 

Mercouri was later criticized for living in the comforts of a 400 sq. m. apartment at avenue Akademias 4, much of which had been commandeered by the Germans at a time when the Greek people were starving, and of not contributing to the national resistance. Melina had commented on this period of her life, both in her autobiography, "I was born a Greek," and on television as Minister of Culture, taking responsibility for her non-participation in the Resistance during the Occupation.

Lycurgos Kallergis, a member of EAM and the Left during the Occupation, said: "Although I was and am a left-winger, the issue of the opulence in which she lived did not bother me. After all, Melina was hosting people, feeding people, helping friends.[...] " The great Greek writer Alkis Zei also agrees with this view, stating that during the period of occupation, Melina was hiding left-wingers and giving them money.

At the same time, her brother, Spyros Mercouris, had joined the Resistance as a member of the EPON. Many times, according to testimonies, Melina would secretly take Yadikiaroglou's money and give it to her brother for the Resistance, hiding both him and his comrades in the organization while helping her impoverished colleagues. It was known that during the occupation, despite her then husband's objections, Melina's house, on her own instruction, was always open and welcoming to many people in need, providing them with food and shelter.

Despite occasional criticisms, her dislike of the Nazi occupiers is demonstrated by an incident during the occupation where she disobeyed SS men while at a bar, despite the threat of being shot.

A number of people with strong resistance activities during the occupation became close friends of hers, including writer Iakovos Kambanellis (who wrote 'Stella with the Red Gloves' especially for her), actress Olympia Papadouka, actor Manos Katrakis, actor and secretary of the EAM theatre Dimitris Myrat, writer Alkis Zei, director Nikos Koundouros, and Manolis Glezos.

During the civil war, although Melina Mercouri lived in Kolonaki, which was controlled by the British, she visited her friends and colleagues who had been arrested for their political beliefs. Years later, Aleka Paizi gratefully recounted Melina's visit to the prison where she was being held, to support her.

Later relationships 
In the late 1940s, Melina met Pyrros Spyromilios, with whom she was a couple for seven years. He was alleged to be the great love of her life before she met Jules Dassin. Pyrros Spyromilios was a naval officer and a hero of the Albanian front. He died in March 1961 due to heart hypertrophy, which devastated Melina, even though five years had passed since their separation.

In 1955 she starred in her first feature film, Stella. The film competed at the Cannes Film Festival and during its screening, she met and fell in love with Julius "Jules" Dassin, with whom she was married until the end of her life.

Performing career

Early years on stage
After her graduation, Mercouri joined the National Theatre of Greece and played the role of Electra in Eugene O'Neill's play Mourning Becomes Electra in 1945. In 1949, she had her first major success in the theatre playing Blanche DuBois in A Streetcar Named Desire, staged by Karolos Koun's Art Theatre.

After 1950 she moved to Paris, where she appeared in boulevard plays by Jacques Deval and Marcel Achard, and met French playwrights and novelists such as Jean Cocteau, Jean-Paul Sartre, Colette and Françoise Sagan. In 1953, Mercouri received the Marika Kotopouli Prize. Mercouri returned to Greece in 1955. At the Kotopouli-Rex Theatre, Mercouri starred in Macbeth by William Shakespeare and L'Alouette by Jean Anouilh.

International success

Mercouri's first film was the Greek language film Stella (1955), directed by Michael Cacoyannis, later known for Zorba the Greek (1964). The motion picture received special praise at the 1956 Cannes Film Festival, where she met expatriate American film director Jules Dassin, with whom she would share not only her career but also her life. Their first professional pairing was He Who Must Die (1957). Other films by Dassin and featuring Mercouri followed, such as The Law (1959).

She garnered international acclaim when she starred in Never on Sunday (1960), of which Dassin was the director and co-star. For this film, she earned the Best Actress Award at the 1960 Cannes Film Festival and was nominated for the Academy Award for Best Actress and the BAFTA Award for Best Actress in a Leading Role.

After this, she starred in Phaedra (1962), for which she was nominated again for Best Actress in the BAFTA and Golden Globe nominations. Her role in Topkapi (1964) garnered her a nomination for the Golden Globe Award for Best Actress in Motion Picture Musical or Comedy. Mercouri worked with such directors as Joseph Losey, Vittorio De Sica, Ronald Neame, Carl Foreman, and Norman Jewison. She starred the Spanish language film The Uninhibited (1965) by Juan Antonio Bardem.

Mercouri continued her stage career in the Greek production of Tennessee Williams's Sweet Bird of Youth (1960), under the direction of Karolos Koun. In 1967, she played the leading role in Illya Darling (from 11 April 1967 to 13 January 1968) on Broadway, for which she was nominated for the Tony Award for Best Performance by a Leading Actress in a Musical. Mercouri's performance in Promise at Dawn (1970) earned her another Golden Globe Award nomination.

Mercouri concentrated on her stage career in the following years, playing in the Greek productions of The Threepenny Opera and, for a second time, Sweet Bird of Youth, in addition to the ancient Greek tragedies Medea and Oresteia. She retired from film acting after her role in her last film, A Dream of Passion (1978), directed by her husband, Jules Dassin.

In 1987 the jury of the Europe Theatre Prize awarded her a special prize of the presidency with the motivation: "For the devotion and the commitment of an artist who joins her own theatrical experience with the political belief and the ideal of European culture.".

Mercouri's last performance on stage was in the opera Pylades at the Athens Concert Hall in 1992, portraying Clytemnestra.

Work as a singer
One of her first songs was by Manos Hadjidakis and Nikos Gatsos. It was titled "Hartino to Fengaraki" ("Papermoon") and was a part of the Greek production of A Streetcar Named Desire in 1949, in which she starred as Blanche DuBois. The first official recording of this song was made by Nana Mouskouri in 1960, although the company Sirius, created by Manos Hadjidakis, issued a recording Mercouri made for French television during the 1960s in 2004.

Her recordings of "Athenes, ma Ville", a collaboration with Vangelis, and "Melinaki", were popular in France. Her recording of "Feggari mou, Agapi mou" (Phaedra) was later covered by Marinella in 1965.

Political career

Activism against the Greek junta
At the time of the coup d'état in Greece by a group of colonels of the Greek military on 21 April 1967, she was in the United States, playing in Illya Darling on Broadway. She immediately joined the struggle against the Greek military junta and started an international campaign, travelling all over the world to inform the public and contribute to the isolation and fall of the colonels. As a result, the dictatorial regime revoked her Greek citizenship and confiscated her property.

When her Greek citizenship was revoked, she said: "I was born a Greek and I will die a Greek. Those bastards were born fascists and they will die fascists". In London, she worked with Amalia Fleming and Helen Vlachos of Kathimerini against the junta of the colonels.

Involvement in politics
After the fall of the Junta and during the metapolitefsi in 1974, Mercouri settled in Greece and was one of the founding members of the Panhellenic Socialist Movement (PASOK), a centre-left political party. She was a member of the party's Central Committee and a rapporteur for the Culture Section, while being involved in the women's movement as well.

In the Greek legislative elections of 1974, she was a PASOK candidate in the Piraeus B constituency, but the 7,500 votes were not enough to secure a seat for her in the Hellenic Parliament (she needed 33 more votes), but she was successful in the elections of 1977, after conducting a grass-roots campaign.

Minister for Culture: 1981–1989

When PASOK won the elections of 1981, Mercouri was appointed Minister for Culture of Greece, being the first woman in the post. She would serve in that position for two terms until 1989, when PASOK lost the elections and New Democracy formed a cabinet.

As Minister for Culture, Mercouri took advantage of her earlier career to promote Greece to other European leaders. She strongly advocated the return to Athens of the Parthenon Marbles, that were removed from Parthenon and other buildings on the Acropolis of Athens by Thomas Bruce, 7th Earl of Elgin, and are now part of the British Museum collection in London.

In 1983, she engaged in a televised debate with the then director of the British Museum, David M. Wilson, which was interpreted by many as a public relations disaster for the British Museum. In anticipation of the return of the marbles, she held an international competition for the construction of the New Acropolis Museum, designated to display them and finally established in 2008.

One of her greatest achievements was the establishment of the institution of the European Capital of Culture within the framework of cultural policy of the European Union, that she had conceived and proposed in 1983, with Athens inaugurating this institution being the first title-holder in 1985, while she was a devoted supporter of the Athens bid to host the Centennial Olympic Games.

In 1983, during the first Greek presidency of the Council of the European Union, Mercouri invited the Ministers for Culture of the other nine member states of the European Union at Zappeion, in order to increase the people's cultural awareness, since there was not any reference to cultural questions in the Treaty of Rome, which led to the establishment of formal sessions between the Ministers of Culture of the European Union.

During the second presidency of Greece in 1988, she supported the cooperation between Eastern Europe and the European Union, which was finally implemented one year later with the celebration of the Month of Culture in Eastern countries.

Mercouri commissioned a study for the integration of all the archaeological sites of Athens to create a traffic-free archaeological park to promote the Greek culture. She introduced free access to museums and archaeological sites for Greek citizens, organized a series of exhibitions of Greek cultural heritage and modern Greek art worldwide, supported the restoration of buildings of special architectural interest and the completion of the Athens Concert Hall, and backed the establishment of the Museum of Byzantine culture in Thessaloniki.

In June 1986, Melina Mercouri spoke at the Oxford Union, the debating society, on the matter of the Parthenon Marbles and whether they should remain in London or be returned to Greece. She argued passionately for the Marbles' reunification. She said the Marbles are more to Greece than just works of art: they are an essential element of Greek heritage, which ties directly into cultural identity. She said: "You must understand what the Parthenon Marbles mean to us. They are our pride. They are our sacrifices. They are our noblest symbol of excellence. They are a tribute to the democratic philosophy. They are our aspirations and our name. They are the essence of Greekness."

Minister for Culture: 1993–1994
In the legislative elections of November 1989, PASOK lost and Mercouri was elected a member of the Hellenic Parliament and remained a member of the party's Executive Bureau. In 1990, she was a candidate for Mayor of Athens but she was defeated by Antonis Tritsis.

After PASOK's win in the election of 1993, she was reappointed to the Ministry for Culture. Her major goals in this brief second term in office were: to create a cultural park in the Aegean Sea in order to protect and enhance the environment and civilization of the Aegean Islands, and to link culture with education at all education levels, introducing a system of post-training of teachers.

Death
Mercouri died on 6 March 1994 at Memorial Sloan Kettering Cancer Center, New York City, from lung cancer.

Her sole immediate survivor was her husband, Jules Dassin. The couple had no children. She received a state funeral with Prime Minister's honors. She was buried at the First Cemetery of Athens four days later.

The Melina Mercouri Foundation was founded by her widower. After her death, UNESCO established the Melina Mercouri International Prize for the Safeguarding and Management of Cultural Landscapes (UNESCO-Greece) which rewards outstanding examples of action to safeguard and enhance the world's major cultural landscapes.

Works

Filmography

Tribute
The song "Melina" by Camilo Sesto (from the 1975 album Amor libre) is dedicated to Melína Merkoúri.

On 18 October 2015, Google Doodle commemorated her 95th birthday.

Gallery

Notes

References

External links

Facebook: Melina Mercouri on Facebook
Melina Mercouri at The New York Times Movies

Greek film actresses
Greek stage actresses
1920 births
1994 deaths
Culture ministers of Greece
Greek actor-politicians
20th-century Greek women singers
Actresses from Athens
Singers from Athens
Cannes Film Festival Award for Best Actress winners
Deaths from lung cancer in New York (state)
European integration pioneers
Greek socialists
Greek democracy activists
Greek socialist feminists
Members of the Panhellenic Liberation Movement
PASOK politicians
Greek MPs 1977–1981
Greek MPs 1981–1985
Greek MPs 1985–1989
Greek MPs 1989 (June–November)
Greek MPs 1989–1990
Greek MPs 1990–1993
Greek MPs 1993–1996
Women government ministers of Greece
Burials at the First Cemetery of Athens
20th-century Greek actresses
20th-century Greek women politicians
Politicians from Athens
Greek expatriates in France
Greek expatriates in the United States
Elgin Marbles